Lazaretto, Lazareto, or lazaret is a quarantine station for maritime travelers.

Lazaretto may also refer to:

Places
Lazareto (Mindelo), a town on the island of São Vicente, Cape Verde
Lazareto (Ithaca), an islet near Ithaca, one of the Ionian Islands in Greece
Lazaretto Island (Corfu)
Lazzaretto, a village in Muggia comune in Italy
Lazzaretto Vecchio, an island of the Venetian Lagoon
Philadelphia Lazaretto, a quarantine station near Philadelphia
Lazaretto Point War Memorial, Ardnadam, Scotland

Arts and entertainment
Lazaretto (album), a 2014 album by Jack White
"Lazaretto" (song), a single from the album
Lazaretto (novel), a 2019 novel by Shay K. Azoulay